Degree of Risk is a 1968 Soviet drama film directed by Ilya Averbakh.

Plot 
The film tells about the doctor Sedov, who is forced to make a difficult decision about heart surgery of the famous mathematician.

Cast 
 Boris Livanov as Sedov
 Innokentiy Smoktunovskiy as Sasha
 Alla Demidova as Zhenya
 Lyudmila Arinina as Mariya Aleksandrovna (as L. Arinina)
 Yuri Grebenshchikov as Oleg (as Yu. Grebenshchikov)
 Leonid Nevedomsky as Pyotr (as L. Nevedomsky)
 V. Vasilyev
 Yury Solovyov

References

External links 
 

1968 films
1960s Russian-language films
Soviet drama films
1968 drama films
Films directed by Ilya Averbakh